Pionerskiy Dome is an ice-covered summit about 60 nautical miles (110 km) south-southwest of the Grove Mountains. Discovered by the Soviet Antarctic Expedition in 1958 and named "Kupol Pionerskiy" (Pionerskiy Dome).

Mountains of Princess Elizabeth Land